Two ships of the Royal Australian Navy have been named HMAS Toowoomba, after the city of Toowoomba, Queensland.

 , a Bathurst-class corvette active between 1941 and 1946, before transferring to other navies
 , an Anzac-class frigate entering service in 2005 and active as of 2016

Battle honours
Ships named HMAS Toowoomba are entitled to carry two battle honours:
Pacific 1942
Indian Ocean 1942–44

References

Royal Australian Navy ship names